The Mighty Booshs second series was originally broadcast between 26 July 2005 and 30 August 2005. The series features five main cast members: Julian Barratt, Noel Fielding, Rich Fulcher, Michael Fielding and Dave Brown. The second series centers on Howard Moon (Barratt) and Vince Noir (Fielding), and the adventures they have whilst living in their flat. A DVD of the series was released on 13 February 2006 in Region 2, and on 21 July 2009 in Region 1. The DVD also included the pilot episode for 'The Boosh', made in 2003, before the first series. The episode was titled 'Tundra' and was remade for the first series.

Overview

Setting
The series is set in a flat in Dalston, England, where Howard Moon and Vince Noir, Naboo the Enigma and Bollo the Ape moved into after leaving the Zoo-niverse. Many of the episodes revolve around Howard and Vince's attempts at building a career out of their band, often leaving the flat during their adventures. The adventures of Naboo, now a freelance shaman, and Bollo, now Naboo's familiar, often serve as a subplot.

Production
A second series was commissioned by the BBC in July 2004, after the success of the first series. This was followed by extensive writing sessions, lasting until the actual filming, which took place from June to July 2005.
Unlike the first series, (which by the plots were based upon the radio series) series 2 storylines were completely original and introduced new characters such as the Moon and Old Gregg, as well as a reappearance of the Hitcher from series 1.

Reception
The second series of The Mighty Boosh was the first BBC programme to be made available online before being shown on television, a method which drew in at least 36,000 viewers.

Episodes

{| class="wikitable plainrowheaders" border="1" style="width:100%;"
|-
! style="background:#AE0066; color:#ffffff; width:5%;"| No. inseason
! style="background:#AE0066; color:#ffffff; width:5%;"| No. inseries
! style="background:#AE0066; color:#ffffff;"| Title
! style="background:#AE0066; color:#ffffff;"| Directed by
! style="background:#AE0066; color:#ffffff; width:25%;"| Original air date

|}

Notes

External links
 Series 2 at the BBC

The Mighty Boosh series
2005 British television seasons